Neomyennis appendiculata is a species of ulidiid or picture-winged fly in the genus Neomyennis of the family Ulidiidae.

Distribution
Brazil, Paraguay, Uruguay, Argentina.

References

Ulidiinae
Insects described in 1909
Taxa named by Friedrich Georg Hendel
Diptera of South America